Kilmocar or Kilmacar is a townland and civil parish in County Kilkenny, Ireland. The ruins of a medieval church lie within Kilmacar townland.

References

Civil parishes of County Kilkenny